Kimberly Susan Rhode (born July 16, 1979) is an American double trap and skeet shooter. A California native, she is a six-time Olympic medal winner, including three gold medals, and six-time national champion in double trap. She is the most successful female shooter at the Olympics as the only triple Olympic Champion and the only woman to have won two Olympic gold medals for Double Trap. She won a gold medal in skeet shooting at the 2012 Summer Olympics, equaling the world record of 99 out of 100 clays. Most recently, she won the bronze medal at the Rio 2016 Olympics, making her the first Olympian to win a medal on five different continents, the first Summer Olympian to win an individual medal at six consecutive summer games, and the first woman to medal in six consecutive Olympics.

Early life
Kimberly Rhode was born in Whittier, California, in 1979. Rhode began sport hunting at an early age, traveling on African safaris by the age of 12. Rhode began competing in skeet at age 10.

International competition
Rhode, at 13, won her first world championship title in women's double trap shooting. After double trap shooting was eliminated from the 2008 Summer Olympics, she has concentrated on skeet. Rhode became a Distinguished International Shooter in 1995 (Badge #388). In ISSF World Cup competition, she has won 19 Gold, 7 Silver, and 8 Bronze medals.  At the 2007 World Cup competition in Santo Domingo, she set a new world record in this event with 98 hits (73 in the qualification round and a perfect 25 in the final).

1996 Olympics
Rhode won a gold medal at the 1996 Summer Olympics, making her the youngest female gold medalist in the history of Olympic shooting.

2000 Olympics
Rhode won a bronze medal at the 2000 Summer Olympics in Sydney, Australia.

2004 Olympics
Rhode won a gold medal at the 2004 Summer Olympics in Athens in Women's Double trap.

2008 Olympics
Rhode won the silver medal at the 2008 Summer Olympics in women's skeet.

2012 Olympics
On July 29 at the 2012 Summer Olympics, Rhode won the gold medal in skeet shooting with an Olympic record score of 99, tying the world record in this event. With this medal, Rhode is the only American competitor to win medals for an individual event in five consecutive Olympics. She also became one of the three competitors (and the only woman) to win three Olympic individual gold medals for shooting, along with Ralf Schumann of Germany and Jin Jong-oh of Korea.

2016 Olympics
Qualifying for the 2016 Summer Olympics made Rhode the first U.S. Olympian to qualify for an Olympic team on five different continents. Kim Rhode won the bronze medal at the Rio 2016 Olympics, making her the first Olympian to win a medal on five different continents,  the first Summer Olympian to win an individual medal at six consecutive summer games, and the first woman to medal in six consecutive Olympics.

TV Host
Rhode is co-host of the Outdoor Channel's TV program Step Outside. Rhode studied Pre-veterinary medicine at Cal Poly Pomona.

Stolen competition shotgun
On September 11, 2008, Rhode's competition shotgun was stolen from her pickup; she had been using it in competition for eighteen years. The gun was returned to her in January 2009 after it was discovered during an unrelated search of a parolee's home; the parolee was charged with possession of stolen property. In the meantime fans had donated to buy her a new $13,000 Perazzi shotgun. Having become used to training with the new gun, she elected to retire "Old Faithful" after four Summer Games.

Personal life
Rhode spoke at the 2012 Republican National Convention, introducing several other Olympians on the stage.

Rhode married Mike Harryman in 2009. Their son was born in 2013.

In addition to being a member of USA Shooting's National Team, Rhode is an honorary lifetime member of the National Rifle Association and a member of Safari Club International.

On April 26, 2018, she filed a lawsuit named Rhode v. Becerra (now Rhode v. Bonta) challenging California's ammo restrictions as a result of the voter-approved 2016 California Proposition 63.

Career results

References

External links
 
 
 
 
 Kim Rhode at USA Shooting

California State Polytechnic University, Pomona alumni
1979 births
Living people
American female sport shooters
United States Distinguished Marksman
Skeet shooters
Shooters at the 1996 Summer Olympics
Shooters at the 2000 Summer Olympics
Shooters at the 2003 Pan American Games
Shooters at the 2004 Summer Olympics
Shooters at the 2007 Pan American Games
Shooters at the 2008 Summer Olympics
Shooters at the 2011 Pan American Games
Shooters at the 2012 Summer Olympics
Shooters at the 2015 Pan American Games
Shooters at the 2016 Summer Olympics
Olympic gold medalists for the United States in shooting
Olympic silver medalists for the United States in shooting
Olympic bronze medalists for the United States in shooting
Sportspeople from Whittier, California
Trap and double trap shooters
Medalists at the 2016 Summer Olympics
Medalists at the 2012 Summer Olympics
Medalists at the 2008 Summer Olympics
Medalists at the 2004 Summer Olympics
Medalists at the 2000 Summer Olympics
Medalists at the 1996 Summer Olympics
Pan American Games gold medalists for the United States
Pan American Games silver medalists for the United States
California Republicans
Pan American Games medalists in shooting
Shooters at the 2019 Pan American Games
Medalists at the 2015 Pan American Games
Medalists at the 2019 Pan American Games
21st-century American women